The Palace Hotel is an historic modernist hotel in Helsinki, opened in 1952, the year of the Helsinki Olympic Games. The building was designed by architects Viljo Revell and Keijo Petäjä, and was constructed during 1949–1952. In addition to the Palace Hotel and related restaurants, the building hosted also the main offices of the Confederation of Finnish Industry and Employers. The interiors of the building were furnished by various renowned Finnish interior designers, such as Olli Borg, Antti Nurmesniemi and Olavi Hänninen.

The hotel building has been included in the selection of Finnish masterpieces of modernism in architecture by the Docomomo International organization.

See also 
 Hotel Kämp
 Hotel Marski
 Hotel Torni

References

Hotel buildings completed in 1952
Hotels in Helsinki
Modernist architecture in Finland